High Wycombe Station is a bus and railway station in High Wycombe, a suburb of Perth, Western Australia. It opened on 9 October 2022. It is the terminus of the Airport Line, which is on the Transperth suburban rail network, a bus station with eight active bus bays, and provides parking for up to 1200 vehicles as well as bicycles. The railway station part has an island platform, accessed via a ground-level concourse. Services run every 12 minutes during peak, and every 15 minutes between peak.

Description

High Wycombe Station is in High Wycombe, Western Australia, a suburb of Perth. It is on the Airport Line of the Transperth suburb rail network. The line diverges from the Midland Line east of Bayswater railway station. A journey to Perth station takes 20 minutes.

The railway station part consists of an island platform with two platform faces. The  platform accommodates Transperth 6-car trains – the longest trains on the Transperth network. To the east behind a large retaining wall is the bus station part and the car park. The rail platform is accessed by a concourse, which is at ground level east of the platform. To the west of the station is Dundas Road, at the same level as the platforms. A tunnel boring head has been installed as a monument in-between the platforms and the multi-level car park.

The bus interchange has eight active bus stands, and four layover bays. The car park is a multi storey car park.

The distinctive steel roof serves as a clearly identifiable entry point, with its matte finish reducing glare to pilots flying overhead.

History
During planning, the station was known as Forrestfield station.

In April 2016, the $1.176 billion contract for the Forrestfield–Airport Link was awarded to a joint venture by Italian company Salini Impregilo and Australian company NRW. Construction commenced in late 2016, with Tunnel Boring Machine (TBM) Sandy launching from the  dive structure at the site of the station in October 2017.

As part of the project, Dundas Road was closed and realigned between Maida Vale Road and Imperial Street in Forrestfield, in order for the  retaining wall for the station to be constructed. Prior to the realignment, the road bisected the construction site which resulted in safety and congestion issues. The new section of Dundas Road opened in August 2018.

The leak also resulted in movement within 16 concrete rings and damage to a  section of one tunnel, delaying the completion of the project from the end of 2020 to the second half of 2021. Dundas Road was reopened in late December after ground stabilisation works.

The station passed the 50 per cent completion landmark in September 2019, with the installation of structures such as the twin  escalators, and the 36 concrete walls which make up the  platform. Much of the content was locally built, such as the steel beams and columns used to support the roof.

A major milestone was achieved in November 2019, with the first delivery of rail arriving at the station site.

Due to the large catchment size of the station, a multi-deck car park accommodating 1200 cars was built to satisfy demand for parking. The three-level car park is situated between Maida Vale Road and Ibis Place. Initial plans called for an at-grade car park, however, the current design was preferred as it allows for passengers to park within  of the station entrance. 80 drop off bays will also be built close to the station entrance. Construction commenced on June 26, 2020.

On 16 August 2022, it was announced the line would open on 9 October 2022.

Services
High Wycombe railway station is served by the Airport railway line on the Transperth network. Rail services are operated by Transperth Train Operations, a division of the Public Transport Authority. The line goes between High Wycombe station and Claremont station, via Bayswater station and Perth station. Airport line trains depart the station every 12 minutes during peak, and every 15 minutes during the day outside peak. At night time, trains are half-hourly or hourly.

It is estimated that up to half of all passengers for the station will arrive by bus. Consultation for bus routes serving the station began in October 2021.

High Wycombe station has a bus interchange with eight bus stands with eight regular bus routes.

References

External links

Railway stations in Australia opened in 2022
Railway stations in Perth, Western Australia
Airport line, Perth